The 2016 LPGA of Japan Tour was the 49th season of the LPGA of Japan Tour, the professional golf tour for women operated by the Ladies Professional Golfers' Association of Japan. The 2016 schedule included 38 official events.

Lee Bo-mee won five tournaments and was the leading money winner with earnings of ¥175,869,764. Ranked next were Jiyai Shin with ¥147,098,013 and Ritsuko Ryu with ¥134,114,013.

Schedule
The number in parentheses after winners' names show the player's total number wins in official money individual events on the LPGA of Japan Tour, including that event. All tournaments were played in Japan.

Events in bold are majors.
(a) denotes amateur

The Toto Japan Classic was co-sanctioned with the LPGA Tour.

References

External links
 

LPGA of Japan Tour
LPGA of Japan Tour
LPGA of Japan Tour